Prerak Mankad (born 23 April 1994) is an Indian cricketer who plays for Saurashtra. On 24 February 2016 he made his first-class debut in the final of the 2015–16 Ranji Trophy. He made his List A debut for Saurashtra in the 2016–17 Vijay Hazare Trophy on 25 February 2017.

He was the leading run-scorer for Saurashtra in the 2018–19 Vijay Hazare Trophy, with 212 runs in six matches. In February 2022, he was bought by the Punjab Kings in the auction for the 2022 Indian Premier League tournament.

References

External links
 

1994 births
Living people
Indian cricketers
Punjab Kings cricketers
Saurashtra cricketers
People from Sirohi district